Antropovo is a rural locality (a village) in Andreyevskoye Rural Settlement, Vashkinsky District, Vologda Oblast, Russia. The population was 6 as of 2002.

Geography 
Antropovo is located 46 km northwest of Lipin Bor (the district's administrative centre) by road. Moseyevo is the nearest rural locality.

References 

Rural localities in Vashkinsky District